"Mighty River" is a 2017 song performed by Mary J. Blige. It is co-written by Blige, Taura Stinson and Raphael Saadiq, who also served as a producer and composer along with Taura Stinson. The song was released as a lead single from the soundtrack album of 2017 film Mudbound. "Mighty River" received Academy Award and Golden Globe Award nominations for Best Original Song.

Accolades

References

External links
 
 Mighty River at Oscars.org  
 
 "Mighty River" lyrics at Genius

2017 singles
2017 songs
Songs written by Mary J. Blige
Songs written by Raphael Saadiq
Songs written by Taura Stinson